Mabalane is a town in Mozambique located on the Limpopo River. There was a prison camp and garrison at Mabalane during the revolution.

Mabalane was affected by the floods that affected Mabalane District in February 1996. The flooding of the Limpopo saw the town and 12 villages partly submerged causing serious damage.

Transport 
It is served by a station on the southern main line of Mozambique Railways.

See also 
 Transport in Mozambique

References 

Populated places in Maputo Province